Applied Developmental Science a is peer-reviewed academic journal on developmental psychology published by Taylor & Francis.

Abstracting and indexing 
The journal is abstracted or indexed in:

According to the Journal Citation Reports, the journal has a 2020 impact factor of 3.479 and a 5-year impact factor of 4.364, ranking it 22nd out of 78 journals in the category "Psychology, Developmental".

References

External links 
 

Developmental psychology journals
Quarterly journals
Publications established in 1997
English-language journals
Taylor & Francis academic journals